Edgar Wooded Wesley (May 2, 1891 – July 12, 1966) was a Negro league first baseman for a few years before the founding of the first Negro National League, and playing in its first few seasons.

Wesley played most seasons for the Detroit Stars. His last known games were played for the Bacharach Giants in 1931.

Wesley died in Austin, Texas in 1966 at age 75.

References

External links
 and Baseball-Reference Black Baseball stats and Seamheads

Negro league baseball managers
Bacharach Giants players
Brooklyn Royal Giants players
Chicago American Giants players
Detroit Stars players
Harrisburg Giants players
Cleveland Hornets players
People from Waco, Texas
1891 births
1966 deaths
20th-century African-American sportspeople